The Seven Little Foys is a Technicolor in VistaVision 1955 comedy film directed by Melville Shavelson starring Bob Hope as Eddie Foy. One highlight of the film is an energetic tabletop dance showdown sequence with Bob Hope as Eddie Foy and James Cagney as George M. Cohan (reprising his role from Yankee Doodle Dandy). The story of Eddie Foy Sr. and the Seven Little Foys inspired a TV version in 1964 and a stage musical version, which premiered in 2007.

Plot
Vaudeville entertainer Eddie Foy (Bob Hope), who has vowed to forever keep his act a solo, falls in love with and marries Italian ballerina Madeleine (Milly Vitale). While they continue to tour the circuit, they begin a family and before long have seven children. After the tragedy of the Iroquois Theater Fire threatens to stall Eddie's career, he comes to realize that his children are worth their weight in gold. The second eldest Foy, Charley, narrates the film.

James Cagney reprises his role as George M. Cohan from the film Yankee Doodle Dandy for an energetic tabletop dance showdown sequence.

Cast
 Bob Hope as Eddie Foy
 Milly Vitale as Madeleine Morando Foy
 George Tobias as Barney Green
 Angela Clarke as Clara Morando
 Herbert Heyes as Judge
 Richard Shannon as Stage Manager
 Billy Gray as Bryan Lincoln Foy
 Lee Erickson as Charley Foy
 Paul De Rolf as Richard Foy
 Lydia Reed as Mary Foy
 Linda Bennett as Madeleine Foy
 Jimmy Baird as Eddie Foy Jr.
 Tommy Duran as Irving Foy
 Jimmy Conlin as Stage Mgr
 James Cagney as George M. Cohan
 Marian Carr as Chorine
 Charley Foy as Narrator
 Jerry Mathers as Bryan Lincoln Foy (uncredited)
NOTE:  Mathers played Bryan Lincoln Foy as a 7-year old (Iroquois Theater Fire scene); Gray played the older Bryan Lincoln Foy in the rest of the movie.

Reception
 The writers Melville Shavelson and Jack Rose were nominated for an Academy Award for Best Story and Screenplay at the 28th Academy Awards, held on March 21, 1956.

Other versions
 Bob Hope hosted an hour-long TV version of The Seven Little Foys on January 24, 1964, as part of the NBC series Bob Hope Presents the Chrysler Theatre. The television version featured Eddie Foy Jr. playing his father, Mickey Rooney as George Cohan, and The Osmonds as Mr. Foy's children. The junior Foy originally played his father in the Yankee Doodle Dandy film.
 In 2007, the first stage musical version of The Seven Little Foys, written by Chip Deffaa (featuring songs made famous by the Foys, as well as originals by Deffaa), had its world premiere at Seven Angels Theater in Waterbury, Connecticut. This version was presented at the York Theater in New York City, as part of its Developmental Reading Series in July 2012.

See also
List of American films of 1955

References

External links
 
 
 
 

1955 films
1950s biographical films
1955 comedy-drama films
American biographical films
American comedy-drama films
Biographical films about entertainers
Films directed by Melville Shavelson
Films set in the 1890s
Films set in the 1900s
Films set in the 1910s
Paramount Pictures films
1955 directorial debut films
1950s English-language films
1950s American films